Samrat Upadhyay(born 1964) is a Nepalese born American writer who writes in English. Upadhyay is a professor of creative writing and has previously served as the Director of the Creative Writing Program at Indiana University. He is the first Nepali-born fiction writer writing in English to be published in the West. He was born and raised in Kathmandu, Nepal, and came to the United States in 1984 at the age of twenty-one. He lives with his wife and daughter in Bloomington, Indiana.

In 2001, Upadhyay won a Whiting Award for fiction. He was an English professor at Baldwin-Wallace College in Berea, Ohio before moving to Indiana in 2003.

His books specially portray the current situation in Nepal, which Upadhyay views largely through the lens of contemporary American realist fiction. According to the San Francisco Chronicle, Upadhyay is "like a Buddhist Chekhov."

Selected texts

Arresting God in Kathmandu (2001) 

First published by Houghton Mifflin Company in 2001, Arresting God in Kathmandu is Upadhyay's first book. It is a collection of nine short stories. With Arresting God in Kathmandu Upadhyay won a Whiting Award.

Short stories 

 The Good Shopkeeper
 The Cooking Poet
 Deepak Misra's Secretary
 The Limping Bride
 During the Festival
 The Room Next Door
 The Man with Long Hair
 This World
 A Great Man's House

The Guru of Love (2003) 

First published by Houghton Mifflin Company in 2003, The Guru of Love is Upadhyay's second book and first full-length novel. The Guru of Love was a New York Times Notable Book of the Year 2003.

It is not the basis for the 2008 Mike Myers film The Love Guru.

The Royal Ghosts (2006) 

First published by Houghton Mifflin Company in 2006, The Royal Ghosts is Upadhyay's third book, a collection of nine short stories.

Short stories 

 A Refuge
 The Wedding Hero
 The Third Stage
 Supreme Pronouncements
 The Weight of a Gun
 Chintamani's Women
 Father, Daughter
 A Servant in the City
 The Royal Ghosts

Buddha's Orphans (2010) 

Published by Houghton Mifflin in 2010, Buddha's Orphans is Upadhyay's fourth book and second novel. Using Nepal's political upheavals of the past century as a backdrop, it tells the story of an orphan boy, Raja, and the girl he is fated to love, Nilu, a daughter of privilege. Their love story scandalizes both families and takes readers through time and across the globe, through the loss of and search for children, and through several generations, hinting that perhaps old bends can, in fact, be righted in future branches of a family tree.

Awards

Publications 

 Arresting God in Kathmandu (2001)
 The Guru of Love (2004)
 The Royal Ghosts (2006)
 Buddha's Orphans (2010)
 The City Son (2014)
 Mad Country (2017)

References

External links 
Official website
Profile at The Whiting Foundation
A Review of Buddha's Orphans at Sycamore Review.

Nepalese male novelists
Nepalese male short story writers
Nepalese short story writers
1964 births
American Hindus
Living people
Nepalese emigrants to the United States
People from Kathmandu
Indiana University faculty
Baldwin Wallace University faculty
English-language writers from Nepal